Air Commodore Reginald Newham Waite,  (30 June 1901 – 7 May 1975) was a senior officer in the Royal Air Force during the middle of the 20th century.

Waite joined the RAF in 1920, receiving his initial instruction as a flight cadet at the RAF College Cranwell in Lincolnshire.

In 1948, while Waite was Head of Disbandment at the headquarters of the Allied Control Commission, he suggested that the Berlin Blockade could be broken by an airlift.  Subsequently, the British and Americans started a joint operation to circumvent the Russian blockade of all overland routes.

References
Air of Authority – A History of RAF Organisation – Air Cdre Waite

1901 births
1975 deaths
Commanders of the Order of the British Empire
Companions of the Order of the Bath
Graduates of the Royal Air Force College Cranwell
Royal Air Force officers
Royal Air Force personnel of World War II